Livano Comenencia (born 3 February 2004) is a Dutch footballer who plays as a right-back for Jong PSV.

Career
Comenencia joined the youth academy of PSV in 2012, and was promoted to their reserves in 2021. On 13 February 2022, he signed a professional contract with PSV until 2025.

International career
Born in the Netherlands, Comenencia is of Curaçaoan descent. He is a youth international for the Netherlands, having played with them up to the Netherlands U18s.

References

2004 births
Living people
Dutch footballers
Netherlands youth international footballers
Dutch people of Curaçao descent
Jong PSV players
Eerste Divisie players
Association football fullbacks